Panagiotis Retsos (born 9 August 1998) is a Greek professional footballer who plays as a defender for Super League club Olympiacos, on loan from Italian side Hellas Verona, and the Greece national team.

Club career

Olympiacos
In the summer of 2016, at age 18, he was promoted from Olympiacos' youth team by first manager Víctor Sánchez, who was impressed by his stamina. On 25 August 2016, he made his debut with the club in a Europa League playoffs home match against Arouca.

On 8 February 2017, Retsos has appointed captain of the club in a Greek Cup goalless home draw against Atromitos. Retsos became the youngest captain of a Greek champion club aged only 18, five months and 30 days.

Bayer Leverkusen
On 30 August 2017, the 19-year-old Retsos was sold to Bayer Leverkusen for a fee of £15.75 million. The Bundesliga outfit believe they have signed themselves a future star, with the teenager having already broken records in his career. The 19-year-old centre-back has signed a five-year deal with the Bundesliga outfit after Leverkusen beat off competition from Ligue 1 sides Stade Rennes and Lyon for his signature. On 17 September 2017, he made his debut in Bundesliga in a 4–0 home win game against SC Freiburg as a starter. On the club's Twitter account, Retsos was voted the Man of the Match.

On 9 April 2018, substitute Retsos scored his first goal in Bundesliga by firing into the far corner after a left-wing free-kick broke to him at the far post, in a 4–1 away win against RB Leipzig. It was  his first goal in his professional career. In the Bundesliga this season, Retsos has made a total of 14 starts so far and has also made six substitute appearances. He has impressed during this time, displaying composure at the back for the German outfit.

On 2 August 2018, Retsos suffered a heavy blow to the quadriceps during pre-season training with Bayer Leverkusen and according to the initial medical evaluation, he was diagnosed with tendonitis in the right thigh. The injury is expected to sideline the defender for at least six weeks. It is Retsos’ first serious injury with the German club and he will miss the kick-off of the 2018–19 Bundesliga season. On 26 October 2018, Retsos is available for selection again and was on the Bayer Leverkusen bench in a UEFA Europa League match against FC Zurich.

On 29 November 2018, after a very difficult period for the defender marred by injury (208 days to be exact), Retsos returned to action in a UEFA Europa League home game against Ludogorets, but was unlucky as in the first half hour left the pitch with a muscular injury on his left thigh and according to the initial reports, Retsos will now spend another 10 to 12 weeks on the sidelines. On 29 October 2019, after a second very difficult period for the defender marred by injury (334 days to be exact), played in a DFB-Pokal game as a substitute in a 1–0 home win against Padeborn SC.

On 19 January 2022, according to various sources, Retsos' transfer to Seria A club Verona was finalized. The 23-year-old international defender arrived on Monday 24 January, in order to undergo a medical examination and then sign his contract, which is lasting 3 and a half years. Leverkusen, under the agreement with Verona, maintain a resale rate of 10%, without any transfer fee as his contract expired in the following summer.

Loan to Sheffield United
On 1 February 2020, Retsos signed for Premier League club Sheffield United on loan from Bayer Leverkusen until the end of the 2019–20 season with a buying option. Unfortunately, the significant financial problems caused by the covid-19 resulted in Sheffield announcing that it would not pay the buying clause from Leverkusen. However, the managers of the English club told Retsos that if he wanted to, his loan could be extended until the end of the championship, in mid-July, but the Greek international decided not to continue after June in the club.

Loan to Saint-Étienne
On 4 October 2020, Bayer Leverkusen's agreement with Saint-Étienne for the loan of Panagiotis Retsos to the French club has been completed  with a purchase option of €6.5 million for the summer of 2021. The French Ligue 1 side will be obliged to tie Retsos down to a permanent deal if he makes 20 appearances, as per the report. The Germans will keep a 15% resale value and the 22-year-old centre-back is even expected to travel to France in the next few hours to complete his permanent transfer to the French club. On 25 October 2020, the Greek defender in the second game of the basic lineup of Saint-Étienne in an away game against the FC Metz was replaced in the third minute of the second half due to a muscular problem. The 22-year-old stopper, who had been out of action for about 2.5 months, returned on 6 January 2021 to the starting line-up of Saint-Étienne, spending the entire 90 minutes in the match against Paris Saint-Germain F.C., where in fact had a very good performance. However, was unlucky as three days later in the away match against Reims he has been replaced at the end of the first half due to new injury.

Despite the hardships, Saint-Étienne tried during the winter transfer window to drop the purchase clause in the agreement with Leverkusen and acquire him with a regular transfer, but the German club appeared unwavering. In fact, that was the reason that Saint-Étienne acquired Pape Abou Cissé on loan with a purchase option from Olympiacos and consequently Retsos did not play until the end of the season, although he was ready from the beginning of March.

Hellas Verona
On 25 January 2022, the 24-year-old Retsos was signed to Hellas Verona on a free transfer. His previous club, maintains a resale rate of 10% and the Greek defender signed a contract initially of one and a half years, according to club's announcement. In the contract of both parties there is an automatic renewal option for three more years, which means that he will be a resident of Verona until 2026.

Loan to Olympiacos
On 31 August 2022, Retsos returned to Olympiacos.

International career
Retsos made his debut for Greece on 31 August 2017, in a 0–0 home draw against Estonia in the 2018 FIFA World Cup qualification. After a further four appearances in 2017, he has not made an appearance since.

Personal life
Retsos was born in Johannesburg, South Africa to  Greek parents Christos and Eleni. He and his family returned to their native Greece a year after his birth.  He has a younger cousin, Christos, who is also a footballer.

Career statistics

Honours
Olympiacos
Super League Greece: 2016–17
Individual
Super League Greece Breakthrough of the Year: 2016–17
Super League Greece Team of the Year: 2016–17

References

External links

 
 
 
 

1998 births
Living people
Soccer players from Johannesburg
Greek footballers
South African people of Greek descent
Greece youth international footballers
Greece under-21 international footballers
Greece international footballers
Association football defenders
Olympiacos F.C. players
Bayer 04 Leverkusen players
Sheffield United F.C. players
AS Saint-Étienne players
Hellas Verona F.C. players
Super League Greece players
Bundesliga players
Ligue 1 players
Serie A players
Greek expatriate footballers
Expatriate footballers in England
Expatriate footballers in Germany
Expatriate footballers in France
Expatriate footballers in Italy
Greek expatriate sportspeople in England
Greek expatriate sportspeople in Germany
Greek expatriate sportspeople in France
Greek expatriate sportspeople in Italy
Naturalized citizens of Greece